Hyperthymesia, also known as hyperthymestic syndrome or highly superior autobiographical memory (HSAM), is a condition that leads people to be able to remember an abnormally large number of their life experiences in vivid detail. It is extraordinarily rare, with only 61 people in the world having been diagnosed with the condition as of 2021.

American neurobiologists Elizabeth Parker, Larry Cahill, and James McGaugh (2006) identified two defining characteristics of hyperthymesia: spending an excessive amount of time thinking about one's past, and displaying an extraordinary ability to recall specific events from one's past. The authors wrote that they derived the word from Ancient Greek: hyper- ("excessive") and thymesis ("remembering"), but there is no such word as thymesis; it may allude to the Greek enthymesis, which means "consideration", and is derived from thymos "mind".

Signs and symptoms
Individuals with hyperthymesia can extensively recall the events of their lives, as well as public events that hold some personal significance to them. Those affected describe their memories as uncontrollable associations; when they encounter a date, they "see" a vivid depiction of that day in their heads without hesitation or conscious effort. While memories are reported as vivid, they are not exact recordings of all experiences, as seen in the case of Jill Price, then anonymised as "AJ": Although she describes her mind like having a movie running, she is not recording her world verbatim in its totality. One day after several hours together, she was asked to close her eyes and tell what her two interviewers were wearing. She was unable to do so.

There is a distinction between those with hyperthymesia and those with other forms of exceptional memory, who generally use mnemonic or similar rehearsal strategies to memorize long strings of information. Memories recalled by hyperthymestic individuals tend to be personal, autobiographical accounts of both significant and mundane events in their lives. This extensive and highly unusual memory does not derive from the use of mnemonic strategies; it is encoded involuntarily and retrieved automatically. Despite perhaps being able to remember the day of the week on which a particular date fell, hyperthymestics are not calendrical calculators, like some people with savant syndrome. Rather, hyperthymestic recall tends to be constrained to a person's lifetime and is believed to be a subconscious process.

Researchers have also found that the accuracy and detail of memories of people with HSAM improves over time. This was published in a paper in Frontiers in Psychology which stated "[t]hese data suggest that HSAM [individuals] experience normal encoding, yet enhanced consolidation and later recall of autobiographical events." Individuals with HSAM remember their own experiences very well, but do not perform as well when recalling details of events that has been told to them.

Although people showing a high level of hyperthymesia are not regarded as autistic, certain similarities exist between the two conditions. Like autistic savants, some individuals with hyperthymesia may also have an unusual and obsessive interest in dates. As the first documented hyperthymestic, Jill Price was quite different from the famous case of mnemonist Solomon Shereshevsky (as documented by psychologist Alexander Luria). Shereshevsky could memorize virtually unlimited amounts of information deliberately, while Price could not – she could only remember autobiographical information (and events she had personally seen on the news or read about). In fact, she was not very good at memorization in general, according to the study published in Neurocase. Hyperthymestic individuals appear to have poorer than average memory for arbitrary information. Another striking parallel drawn between the two cases was that Shereshevsky exemplified an interesting case of synesthesia and it has been suggested that superior autobiographical memory is intimately tied to time-space synesthesia.

Difficulties
Hyperthymestic abilities can have a detrimental effect. The constant, irrepressible stream of memories has caused significant disruption to Price's life. She described her recollection as "non-stop, uncontrollable and totally exhausting" and as "a burden". Price is prone to getting lost in remembering. This can make it difficult to attend to the present or future, as she is often spending time re-living the past. Others who have hyperthymesia may not display any of these traits, however.

Price displays considerable difficulty in memorizing allocentric information. According to James McGaugh, "Her autobiographical memory, while incredible, is also selective and even ordinary in some respects". This was demonstrated by her having poor performance on standardised memory tests and average performance at school, unable to apply her exceptional memory to her studies.

Deficits in executive functioning and anomalous lateralisation were also identified in Price. These cognitive deficiencies are characteristic of frontostriatal disorders.

Even those with a high level of hyperthymesia do not remember exactly everything in their lives or have "perfect memory". Studies have shown that it is a selective ability, as shown by Price's case, and they can have comparative difficulty with rote memorization and therefore cannot apply their ability to school and work.
 
Their memorization of events tends to exceed their ability to memorize given facts; for example, if you told a hyperthymesiac a fact about the world, they may not remember what you said, but they will be more likely to remember what you wore and other details of the situation when you told them.

People with hyperthymesia also have difficulties letting go of difficult events or traumatic memories, which can stay with them for life. Joey DeGrandis, who was featured in the magazine Time said, "I do tend to dwell on things longer than the average person, and when something painful does happen, like a break-up or the loss of a family member, I don’t forget those feelings."

Causes
Because of the small number of people diagnosed with hyperthymesia, relatively little is known about the processes governing this superior memory ability. However, more is beginning to be understood about this condition.

Psychological
It has been proposed that the initial encoding of events by such people includes semantic processing, and therefore semantic cues are used in retrieval. Once cued, the memory is retrieved as episodic and follows a pattern similar to that of a spreading activation model. This is particularly evident in Jill Price's case. She describes how one memory triggers another, which in turn triggers another and how she is powerless to stop it: "It's like a split screen; I'll be talking to someone and seeing something else." This theory serves to explain why hyperthymestics have both a sense of 'knowing' (semantic memory) and 'remembering' (episodic memory) during recollection.

One writer claimed hyperthymesia may be a result of reviewing memories constantly to an obsessive-compulsive degree. However, Price has completely dismissed this article as "a load of crap" and others with hyperthymesia claim to never revisit uneventful memories. Other findings have shown that the tendencies to absorb new information and fantasize are personality traits that are higher in hyperthymestics than the rest of the population. These traits, absorption and fantasizing, also correlated with a test which measures superior autobiographical memory within the hyperthymestic sample.

Biological
An MRI study conducted on Price provides a plausible argument as to the neurological foundation of her superior memory. Both the temporal lobe and the caudate nucleus were found to be enlarged.

Parker and colleagues speculated that a defective frontostriatal circuit could be responsible for the observed executive function deficits in hyperthymesia. This circuit plays a crucial role in some neurodevelopmental disorders including obsessive–compulsive disorder and Alzheimer's. Given the parallels in some aspects of behavior, Price's hyperthymestic abilities possibly stem from atypical neurodevelopment. Scientists now need to ascertain if and how these brain areas are connected to establish a coherent neurological model for superior autobiographical memory.

For autobiographical memory, the hippocampus, located in the medial temporal lobe, is involved in the encoding of declarative memory (memory for facts and events), while the temporal cortex is involved in the storage of such memory. The caudate nucleus is primarily associated with procedural memory, in particular habit formation, and is, therefore, intrinsically linked to obsessive-compulsive disorder.

A 2018 clinical trial published that there were higher levels of activation in the medial prefrontal cortex and temporoparietal junction along with heightened connection between the prefrontal cortex and the hippocampus in individuals with hyperthymesia, suggesting that these regions may play a role in the enablement of the condition. This contradicts information published errlier in a Wired article, which states that the famous hyperthymesiac Jill Price had been brain scanned and her "hippocampus and prefrontal cortex were reportedly normal", suggesting that these regions of the brain do not need to be different for hyperthymesia to occur.

Diagnosis
Parker and colleagues used a variety of standardised neuropsychological tests in their diagnosis of Price's hyperthymesia. These included tests of memory, lateralisation, executive functions, language, calculations, IQ, and visual-spatial and visual-motor functions. They also devised novel tests to examine the extent of her memory abilities. These mostly consisted of questions pertaining to specific dates and events in history. Some of her personal recollections were verified with diary entries, as well as by her mother.

Neuroscientist David Eagleman at Stanford University developed a free online test for hyperthymesia (no longer available). Participants first give their year of birth, and then are challenged to match dates to 60 famous events that happened between the time they were five years old and the present day. To qualify as potentially hyperthymestic, participants must achieve a score at least three standard deviations above the average. To prevent people from searching for answers on-line during the test, reaction time for each question is measured; answers must be chosen within 11 seconds to qualify for consideration. However, many of the questions are sourced in American culture and test results could have a strong cultural bias against non-Americans.

Society and culture

Notable cases
, six cases of hyperthymesia have been confirmed in peer-reviewed articles, the first being that of Jill Price (initially anonymized as "AJ") in 2006. More cases had been identified by 2012, but are yet to be published. Price's case was originally reported by researchers from the University of California, Irvine, Elizabeth Parker, Larry Cahill, and James McGaugh, and is credited as being the first case of hyperthymesia. Price can apparently recall every day of her life from when she was 14 years old: "Starting on February 5th, 1980, I remember everything. That was a Tuesday."

In March 2009, Price was interviewed for an article in Wired magazine by Gary Marcus, a cognitive psychologist at New York University. Price's brain had been subject to a brain scan and the hippocampus and prefrontal cortex had been reportedly normal. Marcus claimed, however, that her brain resembled "those of people with obsessive-compulsive disorder" and suggested that her remarkable memory might be "the byproduct of obsession", claiming also that "the memory woman clings tightly to her past". Price has since reacted angrily to such claims and McGaugh has also expressed skepticism about this explanation. Price gave her first interview in over a year for the UK's Channel 4 documentary The Boy Who Can't Forget, and provided an insight into just how difficult life can be for people who have this ability.

As the condition has become better known, more people claiming to have hyperthymestic abilities have emerged. In the aftermath of the 2006 Neurocase publication alone, more than 200 people contacted McGaugh; however, only a handful of cases were determined to be actual cases of hyperthymesia. The second verified case was Brad Williams, the third was Rick Baron, and in 2009, Bob Petrella became the fourth person diagnosed with hyperthymestic syndrome.

On December 19, 2010, actress Marilu Henner was featured on the U.S. television program 60 Minutes for her superior autobiographical memory ability. Henner claimed she could remember almost every day of her life since she was 11 years old. The show was initially pitched as a story featuring hyperthymestic violinist Louise Owen, but the reporter Lesley Stahl volunteered her friend Henner as having a similar ability.

In June 2012, the case of H.K. Derryberry was reported, a blind 20-year-old man who could clearly recall every day of his life since the age of about 11. A severe brain hemorrhage was the likely cause of cerebral palsy, and his prematurity resulted in congenital blindness. He told researchers that his memories are rich in sensory and emotional details, regardless of whether they are from years ago or yesterday. About 90% of his memories are in the first person, compared with an average of 66% in the general population. Brandon Ally and his team, at Vanderbilt University, Nashville, Tennessee, conducted a series of tests with the subject, including a brain scan that was compared with 30 age-matched controls. His brain was smaller than average (probably a result of his premature birth at 27 weeks). His right amygdala, however, was 20% larger, with enhanced functional connectivity between the right amygdala and hippocampus and in other regions. In 2016, HK's remarkable life story was published by HarperCollins Christian Publishing in a book entitled The Awakening of HK Derryberry: My Unlikely Friendship with the Boy Who Remembers Everything, which details his medical condition. It was written by his mentor Jim Bradford with the help of Andy Hardin.

In September 2012, UK's Channel 4 screened the documentary The Boy Who Can't Forget, which examined the memory of 20-year-old Aurelien Hayman from Cardiff, a student at Durham University, who remembers practically every day of his life from the age of 10. Hayman is the first British person to be identified as possessing this ability, and he views it positively. When Hayman's brain was scanned by a team led by Professor Giuliana Mazzoni at the University of Hull, whilst he was prompted to remember a series of dates, a series of "visual areas" of the brain were activated, with much greater speed than would be expected in normal brain function. Potential problems with total recall were illustrated. The documentary also featured 62-year-old TV producer Bob Petrella, whose memory has allowed him to catalogue the events from his "favorite days" over many years into an extensive scrapbook.

In March 2015, Markie Pasternak of Green Bay, Wisconsin was diagnosed as the youngest person to be living with HSAM. Born in 1994, Pasternak remembers every day of her life since February 2005. She was featured on 60 Minutes Australia in August 2016 with Rebecca Sharrock.

In January 2016, painter and polymath Nima Veiseh was featured by the BBC for his use of hyperthymesia to create paintings that were said to only be producible with vast memories of art pieces, although a paper published in the journal Memory in 2022 claimed that having hyperthymesia does not increase one's creative thinking. Veiseh claimed he could remember almost every day of his life since he was 15 years old, and that his ability to synthesize time and an "encyclopedic knowledge of the history of art" enabled him to create wholly unique visions on canvas. In March 2016 NPR examined further Veiseh's exploration of time and the human experience through art.

In April 2017, Rebecca Sharrock of Brisbane, Australia became known as a person who claims to recall even circumstantial details of every day of her life from her 12th day of life onward. Discussing her hyperthymesia with BBC World Service, Sharrock revealed she was supporting two research projects – one with the University of Queensland and another with the University of California – to understand how a greater knowledge of hyperthymesia can support Alzheimer's disease research, particularly in repairing the degeneration of the hippocampus. Scans conducted during the studies showed that Sharrock's brain exhibited a heightened connection between the conscious and sub-conscious parts of her brain, which may aid easier memory recall – particular for events that took place earlier in life.

In December 2017, a man named Joey DeGrandis was verified as having HSAM by James McGaugh and subsequently featured in an article in the magazine Time. DeGrandis also reports having poor short-term memory, indicating that HSAM does not necessarily improve one's short-term memory abilities.

A 63-year-old man, anonymized as "The Amazing Memory Man" (MM) was featured in a paper by Neuropsychology in March 2018, where is it reported that he "appreciates that his memory for personally experienced life events and general knowledge are both exceptional, whereas his imaging the future is only average" (after scoring 123 on Episodic, 123 on Semantic, 112 on Spatial, and 91 on Future remembering memory types, all with a mean of 100).

In October 2018, it was reported that teenager Tyler Hickenbottom, who is an identical twin, had the condition, which allowed him to "remember every day of his life like it was yesterday".

Controversies
The debate as to whether hyperthymestic syndrome can be considered a distinct form of memory is ongoing. It is also open to question how far it is an all-or-none condition, or whether people can have the condition to different degrees.

K. Anders Ericsson of Florida State University does not believe that sufficient evidence exists to suggest that the skills of Price and Williams need additional explanation: "Our work has pretty much concluded that differences in memory don't seem to be the result of innate differences, but more the kinds of skills that are developed."

McGaugh rejects the idea that hyperthymestic syndrome can be explained away so easily; he argues that nothing explains how subjects are able to memorize so much: "You'd have to assume that every day they rehearse it... The probability of these explanations dwindles as you look at the evidence."

Cases of hyperthymesia have forced many people to re-evaluate what is meant by "healthy" memory: "it isn't just about retaining the significant stuff. Far more important is being able to forget the rest."

Significant debate also exists over the limits of memory capacity. Some are of the view that the brain contains so many potential synaptic connections that, in theory at least, no practical limit exists to the number of long-term memories that the brain can store. In 1961, Wilder Penfield reported that specific stimulation of the temporal lobes resulted in vivid recollection of memories. He concluded that our brains were making "continuous, effortless, video-like recordings" of our experiences, but that these records are not consciously accessible to us. However, a study published in the Proceedings of the National Academy of Sciences suggested that those with hyperthymesia may reconstruct memories from traces and incorporate post event information and associations—a finding at odds with Penfield's video-like recording analogy.

Fiction

Books
 In the 1942 short story "Funes the Memorious" by Jorge Luis Borges, the protagonist suffers a head injury after which he gains the ability to remember every detail of what he experiences, but comes to view this as a curse. The condition may not technically be an example of hyperthymesia, but shares some features.
 In the 1980 series The Book of the New Sun by Gene Wolfe, the protagonist remembers everything he has ever seen starting from infancy. He describes his memories as being so vivid that he is capable of re-living anything he has experienced whenever he chooses to do so.
 In a 2011 manga by Kohske called Gangsta, the main character, Worick Arcangelo, is said to have hyperthymesia, which he uses to help police identify murder victims.
 In the 2015 novel Memory Man by David Baldacci, the protagonist, Amos Decker, has hyperthymesia. In the book, a mystery-crime scene-thriller with graphic scenes, Decker uses his perfect memory brought on by a traumatic hit in football to solve the murder of his wife and child, and the school shooting connected to it. Decker recalls his memories as a "DVR", just playing when it wants to, or being rewound and played forward by conscious thought.

Film
 In the 2014 film The Dark Place, the protagonist of the story, Keegan Dark, has hyperthymesia. Keegan uses it to solve the mystery at the heart of the story. His hyperthymesia memories are visually depicted in the movie as "screens" appearing to Keegan, often in an overwhelming and distressing manner.

See also
Daniel McCartney
Hypermnesia
Eidetic memory

References

External links 

 []
 []
 []
 []

Exceptional memory
Memory disorders